Gonzaga Preparatory School in Spokane, Washington, is a private, Catholic high school in the Inland Northwest. Colloquially nicknamed "G-Prep", the Jesuit school has been recognized for its college preparation education and community service.

History
Gonzaga High School was founded in 1887 in the basement of the Gonzaga University administration building.  In 1922, the high school became a formal department of Gonzaga University. In 1954, the school moved from the original campus to its present site in the Logan neighborhood of Spokane, Washington.  In 1975, in response to changing educational conditions, Gonzaga Prep became a co-educational school. In 1992, the high school implemented the Fair Share tuition program.  Currently the school is within the Diocese of Spokane and is administered separately from the university.

The current campus was extensively remodeled in the late 1990s. Then in 2006 $4.4 million was allotted for the construction of a new chapel (Chapel of the Three Companions), renovation of the academic wings, and a new football field. This was followed by a $6 million upgrade of the athletic complex in 2017.

Gonzaga Preparatory School was the first Jesuit school in the country to have a lay president, John Traynor.

Cindy Reopelle is the first catholic lay woman to serve as principal of Gonzaga Preparatory School.

Christian Service
As a part of its extensive service program, Gonzaga requires a semester course on Christian service of all seniors.

Food drive
The Gonzaga Prep Food Drive consistently gathers over 100,000 pounds of food each year before the Thanksgiving holiday. Recipients of collected groceries and turkeys include over two hundred families, the Colville Indian Reservation, the Spokane Tribe, the Morningstar Baptist Church, residents of Summit View Apartments, Second Harvest food bank, and many local food pantries.

Athletics
The Gonzaga Prep Bullpups compete in the 4A classification and are part of the GSL (Greater Spokane League), a league of 10 teams from around Spokane. As a member of the 4A Greater Spokane League, the Bullpups offer athletic opportunities in ten boys sports and ten girls sports:  for boys, football, cross country, basketball, wrestling, soccer, tennis, baseball, track, lacrosse, robotics and golf; and for girls, volleyball, soccer, robotics, cross country, basketball, tennis, softball, track, golf, lacrosse, and cheerleading. Over sixty-five percent of Gonzaga Prep's student body participates in athletics.

Girls' Tennis

G-Prep won seven straight GSL Tennis championships from 1997 to 2003. The Bullpups tennis teams went undefeated for eight years. When Lewis and Clark High School defeated G-Prep on April 13, 2003, it was the Bullpups' first loss since 1996. The team continues to experience success.

Notable alumni
John D. Boswell - electronic musician and filmmaker
David A. Condon - Mayor, City of Spokane 20122020
Bing Crosby - singer/entertainer, winner of Academy Award for Best Actor for role as Father Chuck O'Malley in 1944 film Going My Way
Joe Danelo - NFL placekicker
Timothy Egan - Pulitzer Prize-winning writer
Ray Flaherty - NFL Hall of Famer
Tom Foley - Speaker of the United States House of Representatives 1989-95
Steve Gleason - New Orleans Saints special teams captain
Paulette Jordan - Idaho state representative and 2018 Democratic gubernatorial nominee
Max Krause - NFL running back
Tim Lappano - College football player, American football coach (College football, NFL, and AFL); had his jersey retired from Gonzaga Prep
Anne McClain - NASA astronaut, engineer and lieutenant colonel in the U.S. Army
Al Mengert - professional golfer
Wyatt Mills - baseball player for the Seattle Mariners
Mike Redmond - baseball player and 2013-15 manager of Miami Marlins
Bishop Sankey - running back for University of Washington and NFL's Tennessee Titans, Minnesota Vikings, New England Patriots
David Stockton - professional basketball player
John Stockton - Basketball Hall of Famer, all-time NBA assists and steals leader
Julia Sweeney - actress, comedian, cast member of Saturday Night Live
Chris Tormey - college football head coach
Anton Watson - American college basketball player
Evan Weaver - linebacker for California and NFL's Arizona Cardinals
Miriam Weeks - sex-positive feminist and pornographic actress known by stage name Belle Knox
John Yarno - NFL center, All-American at Idaho  (attended G-Prep through junior year)

References

External links
 
 Video

High schools in Spokane County, Washington
Catholic secondary schools in Washington (state)
Educational institutions established in 1887
Jesuit high schools in the United States
Schools in Spokane, Washington
Schools accredited by the Northwest Accreditation Commission
Roman Catholic Diocese of Spokane
1887 establishments in Washington Territory